Mohamed Serghini (born 1930) is a famous Moroccan poet. Serghini is the author of several poetry collections, a novel and numerous translations. In 2004 he was awarded the Prix International de Poésie Argana.

Mohamed Serghini was born in Fes in 1930. After his study at the University of Al-Karaouine, he continued his education in the field of language and literature  in Baghdad in 1959 and, later, at the faculty of literature of Rabat and finally at the Sorbonne in Paris. He received a 'diplome' in comparative literature in 1963, a PhD in 1970 and another PhD in 1985. Serghini taught at the faculty of literature and social sciences at Dhar Mehrez in Fes, where his poetry debut was published in 1994 called "What have they done to your skulls".

Books
Wa Yakoun Ihraqou Asmaehi Alatiya (And people burn the following words) Casablanca 1987
Bahhar Jabal Qaf (The sailor of Jabal Qaf) 1991
Al-Kaen Assibaey 1992
Wajadtouka Fi hada Alarkhabil (I have found you in this archipel) (novel)
Fes, from the Highest Peak of Cunning (Fes de la Plus Haute Cime des Ruses) 2003, excerpts on Arte East

External links
2M (Moroccan television) 
Translation of some poems by Pablo Neruda into Arabic by Mohamed Serghini

References

20th-century Moroccan poets
University of Paris alumni
1930 births
Living people
People from Fez, Morocco
University of al-Qarawiyyin alumni
21st-century Moroccan poets